Sir Frederic William Metcalfe  (4 December 1886 – 3 June 1965) was a British public servant. He was a former Clerk of the House of Commons and first Speaker of the House of Representatives of Nigeria.

Early life
Metcalfe was born in 1886 to the family of W.P. Metcalfe of Ceylon and Stone Hall, Oxted. He had his early education at Wellington and Sidney Sussex College, Cambridge and later became an honorary fellow of the college.

Career

Military service
During World War I, Metcalfe served with the army from 1914 to 1919 he served with the 6th Special Reserve Battalion of the Rifle Brigade.

Parliamentary
In 1919, Metcalfe gained appointment as an Assistant Clerk in the Department of the Clerk of the House of Commons, he was in the position until 1930 before he became Second Clerk Assistant. He became Clerk Assistant in 1937. In 1948, he was appointed as Clerk of the House of Commons until his retirement in July 1954, he succeeded Lord Campion in that position.

In 1955, Metcalfe became the first Speaker of the House of Representatives of Nigeria after its inauguration on 12 January 1955 by John MacPherson.

Personal life
Metcalfe was married to Helen Goodman of Oxted.

References

 

 
 
 

1886 births
1965 deaths
Speakers of the House of Representatives (Nigeria)
Knights Commander of the Order of the Bath
Clerks of the House of Commons
British civil servants
English cricketers
Berkshire cricketers
British Army personnel of World War I
Rifle Brigade officers